The political parties based in Indian state of Goa

Parties

Registered Unrecognised Parties
 United Goans Party
 United Goans Democratic Party (UGDP) led by Jorson Fernandes
 Goa Suraksha Manch (GSM) led by Subhash Velingkar and Anand Shirodkar
 Goa Praja Party (GPP) led by Pandurang Raut
 Goa Su-Raj Party (GSRP) led by Mathias Xavier Vaz
 Goa Vikas Party (GVP) led by Lyndon Monteiro
 Niz Goenkar Revolution Front (NGRF)
 Goa Nationalist Party
 Goemcarancho Otrec Asro
 Sattari Yuva Morcha

Defunct Regional Parties
 United Goans Party (Sequiera Group), led by Late Dr. Jack de Sequeira
 United Goans Party (Furtado Group), led by Late Alvaro de Loyola Furtado
 United Goans Party (Naik Group), led by Late Babu Naik 
 United Goans Party (Monserratte Group), led by Atanasio Monserratte (merged with Bharatiya Janata Party)
 Frente Popular, led by Late Bertha Menezes Braganza
 Gomant Lok Pokx, led by Late Mathany Saldanha
 Goa People's Party, led by Late Luis Proto Barbosa
 Goa Congress, led by Late Wilfred de Souza
 Goa Rajiv Congress Party, led by Late Wilfred de Souza
 Goa People's Congress, led by Francisco Sardinha
 Save Goa Front, led by Churchill Alemao
 Indian National Congress (Sheik Hassan), led by Sheikh Hassan Haroon (merged with Bharatiya Janata Party)
 Goa Democratic Front (GDF) led by Dayanand Narvekar (merged with Aam Admi Party).

References

Political parties in Goa
Lists of political parties in India